The 1991 SEC women's basketball tournament took place March 1 to March 4, 1991, in Albany, Georgia.

LSU won the tournament by beating Tennessee in the championship game.

Tournament

Asterisk denotes game ended in overtime.

All-Tournament team 
Carolyn Jones, Auburn
Dana "Pokey" Chatman, LSU (MVP)
Annette Jackson-Lowery, LSU
Sheila Johnson, LSU
Daedra Charles, Tennessee

References

Tournament
SEC women's basketball tournament
1991 in sports in Georgia (U.S. state)